Depardieu may refer to:

Delphine Depardieu (born 1979), French actress
Gérard Depardieu (born 1948), French actor and filmmaker
Élisabeth Depardieu (born 1941), French actress, writer, co-producer, ex-wife of actor Gérard Depardieu
Guillaume Depardieu (1971–2008), French actor, son of Gérard Depardieu
Julie Depardieu (born 1973), French actress, daughter of Gérard Depardieu